Ruellia  geminiflora, known locally as ipecacuanha-da-flor-roxa, is a species native to Argentina; Brazil, typically Caatinga and Cerrado vegetation; Guianas, and Venezuela. The roots of this plant contains possibly toxic substances.

Ruellia vindex was formerly thought to be a variety angustifolia of this species.

External links
  Herbier de Guyane (CAY): Ruellia geminiflora
  Sistema de Información de Biodiversidade: Ruellia geminiflora
  Universidad Centroccidental Lisandro Alvarado: Ruellia geminiflora
  Gamarra-Rojas, Cíntia. (2005) Checklist das Plantas do Nordeste (Checklist of Plants of Northeast Brazil):  Ruellia geminiflora

geminiflora
Flora of Argentina
Flora of Brazil
Flora of the Cerrado